Cornelis Piet "Pete" Hoekstra (born October 30, 1953) is a Dutch-American politician who served as the United States Ambassador to the Netherlands from January 10, 2018, to January 17, 2021. A member of the Republican Party, he previously served as the U.S. representative for Michigan's 2nd congressional district from 1993 to 2011.

Born in the Netherlands, Hoekstra immigrated to the United States as a child. In 1992, Hoekstra ran for the U.S. House, defeating thirteen-term incumbent Guy Vander Jagt in the Republican primary and Democratic opponent John H. Miltner in the general election. Hoekstra was the chairman of the House Intelligence Committee from 2004 to 2007. He was a candidate for governor in Michigan's 2010 gubernatorial election, but came in second to Rick Snyder in the Republican primary. Hoekstra was also a candidate for the United States Senate in 2012, losing to Democratic incumbent Debbie Stabenow in the general election.

In July 2017, Hoekstra was nominated to be United States Ambassador to the Netherlands by President Donald Trump. This nomination was confirmed by the U.S. Senate on November 9, 2017, and Hoekstra was sworn in as U.S. Ambassador on December 11, 2017. He took office on January 10, 2018. He left office on January 17, 2021.

Early life and education
Hoekstra was born Cornelis Piet Hoekstra in Groningen, Netherlands. He moved to the U.S. with his parents at the age of three, and Anglicized his name to Peter Hoekstra.  He graduated from Holland Christian High School (Holland, Michigan) in 1971. He received a Bachelor of Arts in political science from Hope College in 1975 and an MBA from the University of Michigan's Ross School of Business in 1977. He then joined office furniture maker Herman Miller and remained there for 15 years, eventually becoming vice president of marketing.

U.S. House of Representatives

Elections
In 1992, Hoekstra made his first bid for public office in the 2nd District. The district, previously the 9th, had been represented for 26 years by Guy Vander Jagt, longtime chairman of the National Republican Congressional Committee. Hoekstra rode his bicycle across the district, charging that Vander Jagt had served in Congress for too long; Vander Jagt had won his first election in 1966, when Hoekstra was 13 years old. He scored a monumental upset, winning by almost six percent. Hoekstra dominated the district's more populated southern portion; Vander Jagt's margins in the northern portion, his longtime base, weren't enough to close the gap. This primary win was tantamount to election in a district reckoned as Michigan's most Republican district; the GOP has held the district for all but four years since it was created in 1873. Hoekstra later defeated Democrat John H. Miltner and Libertarian Dick Jacobs in the general election, with 63% of the vote. Hoekstra continued to ride his bicycle across the district every summer, and biked across the state for his gubernatorial campaign.

When he was first elected, Hoekstra initially pledged to serve no more than six terms (12 years) in the House. However, in 2004, he announced he would break that pledge and seek a seventh term. In 2006, Hoekstra's Leadership PAC (the Mileage Fund) raised nearly $160,000 in Political Action Contributions from contributors including the Teamsters, Michigan Credit Union League, and Little Planet Books.

Hoekstra faced no significant opposition in the Republican primary or in the general election (as in his previous five reelection campaigns) and went on to secure his seventh term. Shortly after the primary, he was named chairman of the Intelligence Committee, succeeding Porter Goss, who became Director of the Central Intelligence Agency.

2006

Hoekstra had no primary opponent. In November he was opposed by the Democratic candidate Kimon Kotos, who was also his 2004 opponent. Hoekstra defeated Kotos 183,518 votes to 87,361 votes.

2008
Hoekstra ran for re-election in 2008 against Fred Johnson, associate professor of History at Hope College. He beat Johnson by 215,471 to 119,959 votes.

Tenure
Hoekstra had a conservative voting record, consistent with the conservative nature of the 2nd congressional district. He opposed abortion rights, opposed expanding health care benefits for children, opposed gay adoption rights and gay marriage, and voted against paid parental leave for federal employees. However, he also opposed amending the Constitution to prohibit flag desecration.

Gun laws 
Hoekstra consistently opposed gun control during his tenure, earning an A rating from the National Rifle Association. In 2005 he voted to prohibit product lawsuits against gun manufacturers. In 1994 he voted against the Federal Assault Weapons Ban.

False claims about WMDs in Iraq
Hoekstra was a proponent of the claim that the Saddam Hussein regime in Iraq possessed weapons of mass destruction (WMDs), and held onto this belief even after no WMDs were found in the wake of the Iraq invasion. In 2006, Hoekstra made headlines by announcing at a press conference in the Capitol that weapons of mass destruction had been located in Iraq in the form of 500 chemical weapons. However, the weapons in question were defunct munitions, manufactured prior to the 1991 Gulf War and which had been scattered throughout Iraq. The media had already reported on these munitions when Hoekstra made his announcement that the weapons had been discovered. Hoekstra's insistence that the Hussein regime possessed weapons of mass destruction were disputed by both Pentagon officials, the Duelfer Report, and the intelligence community.

On November 3, 2006, The New York Times reported that a website created at the request of Hoekstra and Senator Pat Roberts was found to contain detailed information that could potentially be helpful to those seeking to produce nuclear weapons. The website was shut down on November 2 following questioning by The New York Times.

As of September 17, 2007, some news outlets reported that the Congressional committee Hoekstra had overseen had created "erroneous" and "misleading" reports about Iran's nuclear capabilities. "Among the committee's assertions is that Iran is producing weapons-grade uranium at its facility in the town of Natanz. The IAEA called that "incorrect", noting that weapons-grade uranium is enriched to a level of 90 percent or more. Iran has enriched uranium to 3.5 percent under IAEA monitoring."

Operation Iraqi Freedom documents
During the 2003 invasion of Iraq, some 48,000 boxes of documents, audiotapes and videotapes were discovered by the U.S. military.  In March 2006, the U.S. government, at the urging of members of Congress, made them available online at its Foreign Military Studies Office website, requesting Arabic translators around the world to help in the translation.  On April 18, 2006, about a month after the first documents were made public, Hoekstra, chairman of the House Intelligence Committee, issued a news release acknowledging "minimal risks," but saying the site "will enable us to better understand information such as Saddam's links to terrorism, weapons of mass destruction and violence against the Iraqi people." He added: "It will allow us to leverage the Internet to enable a mass examination as opposed to limiting it to a few exclusive elites."

In early November 2006, the entire set of documents was removed. Media reports stated that the website was taken offline because of security concerns regarding the posting of sophisticated diagrams and other information regarding nuclear weapon design prior to the 1991 Persian Gulf war.

Repatriation of Yemeni captives in Guantanamo
On December 27, 2009, Hoekstra commented on reports that Umar Farouk Abdulmutallab, who had allegedly tried to set off a suicide bomb on Northwest Airlines Flight 253 on December 25, 2009, had subsequently confessed to being trained and equipped in Yemen.
Hoekstra called for a halt to the repatriation of Yemeni captives in Guantanamo.

Tea Party Caucus
Hoekstra was a founding member of the Congressional House Tea Party Caucus in 2010.

Committee assignments
 Permanent Select Committee on Intelligence
 As ranking member of the full committee, Rep. Hoekstra may serve as an ex officio member of all subcommittees
 Committee on Education and Labor
 Subcommittee on Early Childhood, Elementary and Secondary Education
 Subcommittee on Workforce Protections

Caucus memberships
 Founding chairman of the Education Freedom Caucus
 Founding chairman of the Congressional Caucus on the Netherlands

2010 gubernatorial election

In December 2008, Hoekstra said he would not seek re-election to his U.S. House seat in 2010, and instead campaign to be Michigan's governor. Hoekstra joined Mike Bouchard, the Oakland County Sheriff and former state senator, former Gateway, Inc. president Rick Snyder, State Senator Tom George and Michigan Attorney General Mike Cox as 2010 Republican gubernatorial candidates. In the primary, held on August 3, 2010, Hoekstra finished second to Snyder.

2012 U.S. Senate election

Hoekstra was suggested as a possible challenger for Democratic incumbent Debbie Stabenow in the 2012 Senate election, but he initially declined to run. Hoekstra later changed his mind and decided to challenge Stabenow in the election. On August 29, 2011, Hoekstra was endorsed by Republican Michigan Governor Rick Snyder, and on September 23, 2011, Hoekstra was endorsed by 2012 Presidential candidate Michele Bachmann.

Hoekstra faced Stabenow and four third-party candidates in the general election. On November 6, 2012, Hoekstra was defeated by Stabenow, receiving 38% of the vote.

Ad controversy
Hoekstra targeted Democratic incumbent Debbie Stabenow with a television ad which ran statewide during the 2012 Super Bowl. The 30-second ad, created by Republican advertising consultant Fred Davis III, opened with the sound of a gong and the image of a Chinese woman (played by 2012 Miss Napa Valley Lisa Chan) riding a bike alongside a rice paddy. The ad sarcastically accused Stabenow of contributing to the U.S.' spending problem, with the woman thanking "Michigan Senator Debbie Spenditnow", in broken English, implying Stabenow has earned China's gratitude for making the U.S. economy "very weak" while China's "get very good".

The commercial included a link to a Hoekstra campaign website with statistics about federal spending, decorated with images of Chinese flags and currency and using a stereotypical Chinatown font. In the HTML code on Hoekstra's site, the woman in the ad is identified as "yellowgirl". A statement released by the Hoekstra campaign said the HTML code was mistakenly shortened from "yellowshirtgirl".

Asian-American groups called the ad "very disturbing", and two of Hoekstra's GOP opponents, Clark Durant and Gary Glenn, questioned whether Hoekstra was the right candidate for Republicans to support. The ad was criticized by Michael Yaki, former aide to House Speaker Nancy Pelosi, a member of the U.S. Commission on Civil Rights, and U.S. Senator Dan Inouye. James Fallows of The Atlantic called it the "most revolting ad". The NAACP denounced the ad as an "unnecessary race card."

The ad proved costly for Hoekstra; several polls reported him losing ground to Stabenow in a head-to-head match-up.

Hoekstra initially stood by the ad, claiming it hit Stabenow "smack dab between the eyes" on the economy.  However, on February 10, 2012, Hoekstra shut down his controversial Chinese-themed website and phased in a new TV commercial in place of his original ad.  American Values super PAC, an Asian American group, claimed credit for the scrub shortly after the group's launch of an online viral ad condemning Hoekstra.

On February 16, Chan apologized for her involvement in the ad. In a statement on her Facebook page, she said the role was "not in any way representative of who I am" and "absolutely a mistake on my part."

Despite the controversy, Hoekstra won the Republican primary. He lost to Stabenow in the general election.

Post-political career
In February 2011, Hoekstra joined the government relations group and Washington, D.C. law firm Dickstein Shapiro, and was named a visiting distinguished fellow at the conservative think tank The Heritage Foundation, concentrating on education reform.  Hoekstra left Dickstein Shapiro in 2014 to join one of its rivals, Greenberg Traurig.

Hoekstra joined Steven Emerson's Investigative Project on Terrorism in 2014 as a Shillman Senior Fellow, specializing in national security, international relations, global terrorism and cyber security.

Hoekstra published his first book in October 2015, Architects of Disaster: The Destruction of Libya with Terri Blumenfeld.

In an interview with NPR's Robert Siegel on December 10, 2014, Hoekstra said he disagreed with the recently released Senate Intelligence Committee report on CIA torture.

CNN's KFile reported that Hoekstra in 2016 accused Huma Abedin of ties with the Muslim Brotherhood. A 2016 Washington Post fact-checker gave that claim "four Pinocchios". CNN also stated that Hoekstra was a frequent guest on a talk show hosted by Frank Gaffney, an anti-Muslim conspiracy theorist based in Washington.

On March 11, 2017, Hoekstra said that Chelsea Manning, Edward Snowden, and other leakers of government materials, having illegally released classified information, were traitors and should have taken their evidence to the intelligence committees of the U.S. Congress for proper investigations.

U.S. Ambassador to the Netherlands
On July 24, 2017, President Donald Trump nominated Hoekstra to be United States Ambassador to the Netherlands. He was confirmed by the Senate on November 9 via voice vote and sworn in by Vice President Mike Pence on December 11, 2017. He took office on January 10, 2018.

Anti-Muslim comments

Later that December, NOS U.S. correspondent Wouter Zwart questioned Hoekstra about inaccurate claims that he had made in November 2015 at a panel titled "Muslim Migration into Europe: Eurabia come True?" hosted by the David Horowitz Freedom Center that the Netherlands had "no-go zones" and that politicians and cars were being set on fire in the country due to radical Islam. Hoekstra told Zwart that he had never said such things, saying, "we would call it fake news. I never said that." Zwart then played the clip in which he made those remarks for his viewers. Later in the interview, Hoekstra denied that he denied it, saying "I didn't call it 'fake news'. I didn't use those words today." On December 23, Hoekstra issued an apology on Twitter, writing that he "made certain remarks in 2015 and regret[ted] the exchange during the Nieuwsuur interview".

On January 10, 2018, during his press conference after presenting his credentials to King Willem-Alexander, Hoekstra said that he did not want to revisit the comments made in 2015. Despite repeated questions from Dutch reporters regarding these comments, Hoekstra refused to talk about these statements and refused to answer further questions.

On January 11, 2018, Under Secretary of State for Public Diplomacy and Public Affairs Steve Goldstein said that in 2015, Hoekstra "made comments that should not have been made", that "the State Department does not agree with those statements" and "that is not the language we would use." He added that the "comments were wrong and don't reflect the U.S. view of the Netherlands". One day later, in an interview with Dutch newspaper De Telegraaf, Hoekstra finally retracted his statement about the presence of "no-go zones" in the Netherlands where cars and politicians are being set on fire, saying: "Looking back, I'm dismayed that I said it. It was an incorrect statement. It was just wrong." He further claimed that he could not recall how he got to the statement or what it was based on, saying: "I've mixed up countries. I was wrong, and I don't know how that could have happened. I do know: it was wrong."

Interference in Dutch politics
In September 2020, a group of Dutch officials demanded answers from Hoekstra in response to reports that he had hosted a fund-raising event at the U.S. embassy for the right-wing Dutch political party Forum for Democracy, a potential violation of international law. This is not the first time Hoekstra has been associated with the far-right party. In May 2020, Hoekstra was interviewed by party leader Thierry Baudet on the party's video channel and he was also a guest speaker at the party's conference in November 2019.

See also
 WMD theories in the aftermath of the 2003 Iraq War

References

External links
 Articles by Pete Hoekstra IPT (Investigative Project on Terrorism)
 
 

|-

|-

|-

|-

|-

1953 births
21st-century American politicians
Ambassadors of the United States to the Netherlands
Dutch emigrants to the United States
Hope College alumni
Living people
Politicians from Groningen (city)
People from Holland, Michigan
People with acquired American citizenship
Reformed Church in America members
Republican Party members of the United States House of Representatives from Michigan
Ross School of Business alumni
Tea Party movement activists
Trump administration personnel
Members of Congress who became lobbyists